Alexander Himelfarb (born July 3, 1947) is a former senior Canadian civil servant and sometime academic.

Early life and family 
Born in Germany, he was raised and educated in Toronto. He received a Ph.D. in sociology from University of Toronto. In 1981, he married Frum Himelfarb (Weiner), and they have three children.

Career

As academic sociologist 
Himelfarb started his career as a professor of sociology at the University of New Brunswick in 1972. He stayed at UNB until 1981. With C. James Richardson, Himelfarb wrote two introductory textbooks on sociology, which were used extensively in Canadian universities in the late 1970s and early 1980s:
 People, Power and Process  (and a reader)
 Sociology for Canadians (two editions, and a reader)

Himelfarb has published numerous monographs, chapters and articles on Canadian society and public policy and co-edited with his son Jordan the book Tax is Not a Four-Letter Word.

As civil servant 
Himelfarb joined the Canadian public service in 1981 in the Department of the Solicitor General of Canada and served in senior positions in various departments and agencies, including the Parole Board of Canada, Justice, Citizenship and Immigration, the Privy Council Office, and Treasury Board, and led the Task Force on the Social Union.  In 1999, he became deputy minister of Canadian heritage. In 2002 under Jean Chretien he was appointed to the dual role of clerk of the privy council and secretary to the cabinet.

On June 14, 2006, under Stephen Harper, Himelfarb was appointed ambassador to Italy, with concurrent accreditation to the Republic of Albania and the Republic of San Marino, and as High Commissioner in the Republic of Malta, and as permanent representative to the Food and Agriculture Organization, the World Food Programme and the International Fund for Agricultural Development, in Rome. He retired as ambassador in 2009.

As university administrator 

In September 2009, Himelfarb was appointed as director of the Glendon School of Public and International Affairs, at York University, retiring from that position in 2014, when he was made director emeritus.

Retirement years 
Himelfarb is the founding chair of the Canadian Alliance to End Homelessness, based at York University. The organization, which follows the highly successful American model, originated in 2000 and focusses on 10-year Plans to End Homelessness and Housing First approaches. He retired from this position in 2018.

In 2016, Himelfarb was chair of the World Wildlife Fund Canada and of the Canadian Centre for Policy Alternatives (CCPA)'s Ontario Advisory Board. He chairs the Narwhal Board and the Steering Committee of CCPA (federal).

Publications 
 Himelfarb and Himelfarb (November 2013): Tax Is Not a Four-Letter Word: A Different Take on Taxes in Canada (Canadian Commentaries Book 3, WLU Press)

Awards and recognition 
In 2000, Himelfarb was awarded The Outstanding Achievement Award, considered the most prestigious award in the Canadian public service. In 2006, he was awarded an Honorary Fellow from the Royal Conservatory of Music and an Honorary Doctor of Laws degree by Memorial University of Newfoundland.

Citations

References

External links
 Alex Himelfarb's Blog
 The Centre for Global Challenges
 Canadian Alliance to End Homelessness

1947 births
Living people
Canadian diplomats
Canadian sociologists
People from Toronto
University of Toronto alumni
Academic staff of the University of New Brunswick
German emigrants to Canada
Clerks of the Privy Council (Canada)
Ambassadors of Canada to Albania
Ambassadors of Canada to Italy
High Commissioners of Canada to Malta